High Impact is a compilation album of Yngwie Malmsteen's instrumental performances since 1983 released on 9 December 2009. The album's unique features include one vocal track and a never-before-released bonus track of Malmsteen's interpretation of the hit classic "Beat It" sung by Tim "Ripper" Owens.

Track listing

2009 compilation albums
Yngwie Malmsteen compilation albums